Jowzar-e Bakesh (also Romanized as Jowzār-e Bakesh and Jūzār Bakesh) is a village in Jowzar Rural District, in the Central District of Mamasani County, Fars Province, Iran. At the 2006 census, its population was 803, in 151 families.

References 

Populated places in Mamasani County